Brandon Eaton (born October 31, 1994) is an American soccer player who most recently played for Forward Madison FC in USL League One.

Career 
Eaton played one year of college soccer at Virginia Tech in 2013, before transferring to Virginia Commonwealth University in 2014, where he played three seasons for the Rams.

Eaton signed with United Soccer League side Richmond Kickers in May 2017. He made his league debut for the club on July 9, 2017, in a 2-0 away defeat to FC Cincinnati.

On January 30, 2019, Eaton signed with USL League One side, Forward Madison FC. He made his league debut for the club on April 6, 2019, coming on as an 81st minute substitute for Jeff Michaud in a 1-0 away defeat to Chattanooga Red Wolves.

eSports 
Brandon competed in the USL eCup in Rocket League for his Forward Madison FC team.

References

External links 

 
 Brandon Eaton at Virginia Tech Hokies

1994 births
Living people
American soccer players
Association football midfielders
Forward Madison FC players
Richmond Kickers players
Soccer players from Norfolk, Virginia
Sportspeople from Chesapeake, Virginia
USL Championship players
VCU Rams men's soccer players
Virginia Tech Hokies men's soccer players
USL League One players